Middletown Historic District may refer to:

United States
(by state then city)
Middletown Upper Houses Historic District, Cromwell, Connecticut, listed on the National Register of Historic Places (NRHP) in Middlesex County, Connecticut
Middletown South Green Historic District, Middletown, Connecticut, listed on the NRHP in Middlesex County, Connecticut
Middletown Historic District (Middletown, Delaware), listed on the NRHP in New Castle County, Delaware
Middletown Historic District (Alton, Illinois), listed on the NRHP in Madison County, Illinois
Middletown Historic District (Middletown, Maryland), listed on the NRHP in Frederick County, Maryland
Middletown Village Historic District, Middletown, New Jersey, listed on the NRHP in Monmouth County, New Jersey
West Middletown Historic District, West Middletown Borough, Pennsylvania, listed on the NRHP in Washington County, Pennsylvania
Middletown Rural Historic District, Grafton, Vermont, listed on the NRHP in Windham County, Vermont
Middletown Springs Historic District, Middletown Springs, Vermont, listed on the NRHP in Rutland County, Vermont
Middletown Historic District (Middletown, Virginia), listed on the NRHP in Frederick County, Virginia